Ahankaar is a 1995 Indian Hindi-language film directed by Ashim Samanta, starring Mithun Chakraborty, Mamta Kulkarni, Mohnish Bahl, Prem Chopra and Gulshan Grover

Plot 
The plot of the movie centers around Prabhat (Mithun Chakraborty). Prabhat's love interest is Naina, a childhood friend. After an accident in which Prabhat saves his mother, he ends up with an inability to speak. A magnanimous factory owner offers him a job soon after, and Prabhat's work supports his family (half-brother, sister, and step-mother), both while his father is in and out of jail. After some time, Prabhat uncovers a plot against his employer and gets the criminal incarcerated, causing him to receive a promotion to manager. However, Prabhat nominates his half-brother, Surya, for the job. Prabhat is eventually ousted from the job. Surya is convinced by some gangsters to commit fraud, which Prabhat sets out to redress.

Cast

Mithun Chakraborty as Prabhat
Mamta Kulkarni as Naina
Mohnish Bahl as Prabhat's stepbrother
Prem Chopra as Prem Chopra
Gulshan Grover as Jwala
Dinesh Hingoo as Vikram, monkey owner Rani
Aruna Irani as Ganga Prasad
Daisy Irani as Naina's mom
Sunila as Anu Chopra
Tiku Talsania as Naina's dad
Ajit Vachani as Dwarga Prasad, Ganga's husband
Pinky as Chanda Prabhat's stepsister

Soundtrack
Music is composed by Anu Malik, and the lyrics were written by Anand Bakshi.

References

External links
 
 https://web.archive.org/web/20110713025944/http://indyashoppe.com/product_info.php?cPath=42&products_id=3678&osCsid=25a4c0491f82ac6240a603511ee1bd71
 

1995 films
1990s Hindi-language films
Mithun's Dream Factory films
Films shot in Ooty
Films scored by Anu Malik
Films directed by Ashim Samanta
Indian action drama films